Torver railway station served the village of Torver, in Lancashire, England (now in Cumbria). It was on the branch line to Coniston.

History 
Authorised by Parliament in August 1857 the line to Coniston was opened by the Coniston Railway less than two years later on 18 June 1859. The station was used for the shipment of slate and stone from the local quarries as well as by passengers.

The station was host to a LMS camping coach from 1934 to 1939.

British Railways closed the station and the branch to passengers on 6 October 1958 and completely on 3 April 1962. The station building remains and has been converted into holiday accommodation.

References

Sources

Gallery

External links 

The station on an Edwardian 25" OS map National Library of Scotland
Torver on a navigable 1946 O. S. map NPE maps
The station Rail Map Online
The station and line with mileages Railway Codes

Former Coniston Railway stations
Disused railway stations in Cumbria
Railway stations in Great Britain opened in 1859
Railway stations in Great Britain closed in 1958
1859 establishments in England